Vertebrates comprise all animal taxa within the subphylum Vertebrata (chordates with backbones), including all mammals, birds, reptiles, amphibians and fish. Vertebrates represent the overwhelming majority of the phylum Chordata, with currently about 69,963 species described. Vertebrates comprise such groups as the following:

 jawless fish, which include hagfish and lampreys
 jawed vertebrates, which include:
 cartilaginous fish (sharks, rays, and ratfish)
 bony vertebrates, which include:
 ray-fins (the majority of living bony fish)
 lobe-fins, which include:
 coelacanths and lungfish
 tetrapods (limbed vertebrates)

Vertebrates make up less than five percent of all described animal species; the rest are invertebrates, which lack vertebral columns.

The vertebrates traditionally include the hagfish, which do not have proper vertebrae due to their loss in evolution, though their closest living relatives, the lampreys, do. Hagfish do, however, possess a cranium. For this reason, the vertebrate subphylum is sometimes referred to as "Craniata" when discussing morphology. Molecular analysis since 1992 has suggested that hagfish are most closely related to lampreys, and so also are vertebrates in a monophyletic sense. Others consider them a sister group of vertebrates in the common taxon of craniata.

Etymology
The word vertebrate derives from the Latin word vertebratus (Pliny), meaning joint of the spine.

Vertebrate is derived from the word vertebra, which refers to any of the bones or segments of the spinal column.

Anatomy and morphology

All vertebrates are built along the basic chordate body plan: a stiff rod running through the length of the animal (vertebral column and/or notochord), with a hollow tube of nervous tissue (the spinal cord) above it and the gastrointestinal tract below.

In all vertebrates, the mouth is found at, or right below, the anterior end of the animal, while the anus opens to the exterior before the end of the body. The remaining part of the body continuing after the anus forms a tail with vertebrae and spinal cord, but no gut.

Vertebral column
The defining characteristic of a vertebrate is the vertebral column, in which the notochord (a stiff rod of uniform composition) found in all chordates has been replaced by a segmented series of stiffer elements (vertebrae) separated by mobile joints (intervertebral discs, derived embryonically and evolutionarily from the notochord).

However, a few vertebrates have secondarily lost this anatomy, retaining the notochord into adulthood, such as the sturgeon and coelacanth. Jawed vertebrates are typified by paired appendages (fins or legs, which may be secondarily lost), but this trait is not required in order for an animal to be a vertebrate.

Gills

All basal vertebrates breathe with gills. The gills are carried right behind the head, bordering the posterior margins of a series of openings from the pharynx to the exterior. Each gill is supported by a cartilaginous or bony gill arch. The bony fish have three pairs of arches, cartilaginous fish have five to seven pairs, while the primitive jawless fish have seven. The vertebrate ancestor no doubt had more arches than this, as some of their chordate relatives have more than 50 pairs of gills.

In amphibians and some primitive bony fishes, the larvae bear external gills, branching off from the gill arches. These are reduced in adulthood, their function taken over by the gills proper in fishes and by lungs in most amphibians. Some amphibians retain the external larval gills in adulthood, the complex internal gill system as seen in fish apparently being irrevocably lost very early in the evolution of tetrapods.

While the more derived vertebrates lack gills, the gill arches form during fetal development, and form the basis of essential structures such as jaws, the thyroid gland, the larynx, the columella (corresponding to the stapes in mammals) and, in mammals, the malleus and incus.

Central nervous system
The central nervous system of vertebrates is based on a hollow nerve cord running along the length of the animal. Of particular importance and unique to vertebrates is the presence of neural crest cells. These are progenitors of stem cells, and critical to coordinating the functions of cellular components. Neural crest cells migrate through the body from the nerve cord during development, and initiate the formation of neural ganglia and structures such as the jaws and skull.

The vertebrates are the only chordate group with neural cephalisation, the concentration of brain functions in the head. A slight swelling of the anterior end of the nerve cord is found in the lancelet, a chordate, though it lacks the eyes and other complex sense organs comparable to those of vertebrates. Other chordates do not show any trends towards cephalisation.

A peripheral nervous system branches out from the nerve cord to innervate the various systems. The front end of the nerve tube is expanded by a thickening of the walls and expansion of the central canal of spinal cord into three primary brain vesicles: The prosencephalon (forebrain), mesencephalon (midbrain) and rhombencephalon (hindbrain), further differentiated in the various vertebrate groups. Two laterally placed eyes form around outgrowths from the midbrain, except in hagfish, though this may be a secondary loss. The forebrain is well-developed and subdivided in most tetrapods, while the midbrain dominates in many fish and some salamanders. Vesicles of the forebrain are usually paired, giving rise to hemispheres like the cerebral hemispheres in mammals.

The resulting anatomy of the central nervous system, with a single hollow nerve cord topped by a series of (often paired) vesicles, is unique to vertebrates. All invertebrates with well-developed brains, such as insects, spiders and squids, have a ventral rather than dorsal system of ganglions, with a split brain stem running on each side of the mouth or gut.

Molecular signatures 
In addition to the morphological characteristics used to define vertebrates (i.e. the presence of a notochord, the development of a vertebral column from the notochord, a dorsal nerve cord, pharyngeal gills, a post-anal tail, etc.), molecular markers known as conserved signature indels (CSIs) in protein sequences have been identified and provide distinguishing criteria for the subphylum Vertebrata. Specifically, 5 CSIs in the following proteins: protein synthesis elongation factor-2 (EF-2), eukaryotic translation initiation factor 3 (eIF3), adenosine kinase (AdK) and a protein related to ubiquitin carboxyl-terminal hydrolase are exclusively shared by all vertebrates and reliably distinguish them from all other metazoan. The CSIs in these protein sequences are predicted to have important functionality in vertebrates.

A specific relationship between Vertebrates and Tunicates is also strongly supported by two CSIs found in the proteins Rrp44 (associated with exosome complex)  and serine palmitoyltransferase, that are exclusively shared by species from these two subphyla but not Cephalochordates, indicating Vertebrates are more closely related to Tunicates than Cephalochordates.

Evolutionary history

External relationships
Originally, the "Notochordata hypothesis" suggested that the Cephalochordata is the sister taxon to Craniata (Vertebrata). This group, called the Notochordata, was placed as sister group to the Tunicata (Urochordata). Although this was once the leading hypothesis, studies since 2006 analyzing large sequencing datasets strongly support Olfactores (tunicates + vertebrates) as a monophyletic clade, and the placement of Cephalochordata as sister-group to Olfactores (known as the "Olfactores hypothesis"). As chordates, they all share the presence of a notochord, at least during a stage of their life cycle.

The following cladogram summarizes the systematic relationships between the Olfactores (vertebrates and tunicates) and the Cephalochordata.

First vertebrates

Vertebrates originated during the Cambrian explosion, which saw a rise in organism diversity. The earliest known vertebrates belongs to the Chengjiang biota and lived about 518 million years ago. These include Haikouichthys, Myllokunmingia, Zhongjianichthys, and probably Haikouella. Unlike the other fauna that dominated the Cambrian, these groups had the basic vertebrate body plan: a notochord, rudimentary vertebrae, and a well-defined head and tail. All of these early vertebrates lacked jaws in the common sense and relied on filter feeding close to the seabed. A vertebrate group of uncertain phylogeny, small eel-like conodonts, are known from microfossils of their paired tooth segments from the late Cambrian to the end of the Triassic.

From fish to amphibians

The first jawed vertebrates may have appeared in the late Ordovician (~445 mya) and became common in the Devonian, often known as the "Age of Fishes". The two groups of bony fishes, the actinopterygii and sarcopterygii, evolved and became common. The Devonian also saw the demise of virtually all jawless fishes save for lampreys and hagfish, as well as the Placodermi, a group of armoured fish that dominated the entirety of that period since the late Silurian as well as the eurypterids, dominant animals of the preceding Silurian, and the anomalocarids. By the middle of the Devonian, several droughts and anoxic events as well as oceanic competition will lead a lineage of sarcopterygii to leave water, eventually establishing themselves as terrestrial tetrapods in the succeeding Carboniferous.

Mesozoic vertebrates
Amniotes branched from amphibious tetrapods early in the Carboniferous period. The synapsid amniotes were dominant during the late Paleozoic, the Permian, while diapsid amniotes became dominant during the Mesozoic. In the sea, the teleosts and sharks became dominant. Mesothermic synapsids called cynodonts gave rise to endothermic mammals and diapsids called dinosaurs eventually gave rise to endothermic birds, both in the Jurassic. After all dinosaurs except birds went extinct by the end of the Cretaceous, birds and mammals diversified and filled their niches.

After the Mesozoic

The Cenozoic world has seen great diversification of bony fishes, amphibians, reptiles, birds and mammals.

Fishes of myriad varieties are the main predators in most of the world's water bodies, both freshwater and marine. The rest of the vertebrate species are tetrapods, a single lineage that includes amphibians (with roughly 7,000 species); mammals (with approximately 5,500 species); and reptiles and birds (with about 20,000 species divided evenly between the two classes). Tetrapods comprise the dominant megafauna of most terrestrial environments and also include many partially or fully aquatic groups (e.g., sea snakes, penguins, cetaceans).

Classification
There are several ways of classifying animals. Evolutionary systematics relies on anatomy, physiology and evolutionary history, which is determined through similarities in anatomy and, if possible, the genetics of organisms. Phylogenetic classification is based solely on phylogeny. Evolutionary systematics gives an overview; phylogenetic systematics gives detail. The two systems are thus complementary rather than opposed.

Traditional classification

Conventional classification has living vertebrates grouped into seven classes based on traditional interpretations of gross anatomical and physiological traits. This classification is the one most commonly encountered in school textbooks, overviews, non-specialist, and popular works. The extant vertebrates are:

 Subphylum Vertebrata
 Class Agnatha (jawless fishes)
 Class Chondrichthyes (cartilaginous fishes)
 Class Osteichthyes (bony fishes)
 Class Amphibia (amphibians)
 Class Reptilia (reptiles)
 Class Aves (birds)
 Class Mammalia (mammals)

In addition to these, there are two classes of extinct armoured fishes, the Placodermi and the Acanthodii, both of which are considered paraphyletic.

Other ways of classifying the vertebrates have been devised, particularly with emphasis on the phylogeny of early amphibians and reptiles. An example based on Janvier (1981, 1997), Shu et al. (2003), and Benton (2004) is given here († = extinct):

 Subphylum Vertebrata
Palaeospondylus
 Infraphylum Agnatha or Cephalaspidomorphi (lampreys and other jawless fishes)
Superclass Anaspidomorphi (anaspids and relatives)
 Infraphylum Gnathostomata (vertebrates with jaws)
 Class Placodermi (extinct armoured fishes)
 Class Chondrichthyes (cartilaginous fishes)
 Class Acanthodii (extinct spiny "sharks")
 Superclass Osteichthyes (bony vertebrates)
 Class Actinopterygii (ray-finned bony fishes)
 Class Sarcopterygii (lobe-finned fishes, including the tetrapods)
 Superclass Tetrapoda (four-limbed vertebrates)
 Class Amphibia (amphibians, some ancestral to the amniotes)—now a paraphyletic group
 Class Synapsida (mammals and the extinct mammal-like reptiles)
 Class Sauropsida (reptiles and birds)

While this traditional classification is orderly, most of the groups are paraphyletic, i.e. do not contain all descendants of the class's common ancestor. For instance, descendants of the first reptiles include modern reptiles as well as mammals and birds; the agnathans have given rise to the jawed vertebrates; the bony fishes have given rise to the land vertebrates; the traditional "amphibians" have given rise to the reptiles (traditionally including the synapsids or mammal-like "reptiles"), which in turn have given rise to the mammals and birds. Most scientists working with vertebrates use a classification based purely on phylogeny, organized by their known evolutionary history and sometimes disregarding the conventional interpretations of their anatomy and physiology.

Phylogenetic relationships
In phylogenetic taxonomy, the relationships between animals are not typically divided into ranks but illustrated as a nested "family tree" known as a phylogenetic tree. The cladogram below is based on studies compiled by Philippe Janvier and others for the Tree of Life Web Project and Delsuc et al., and complemented (based on, and ).  A dagger (†) denotes an extinct clade, whereas all other clades have living descendants.

Note that, as shown in the cladogram above, the †"Ostracodermi" (armoured jawless fishes) and †"Placodermi" (armoured jawed fishes) are shown to be paraphylectic groups, separated from Gnathostomes and Eugnathostomes respectively.

Also note that Teleostei (Neopterygii) and Tetrapoda (amphibians, mammals, reptiles, birds) each make up about 50% of today's vertebrate diversity, while all other groups are either extinct or rare. The next cladogram shows the extant clades of tetrapods (the four-limbed vertebrates), and a selection of extinct (†) groups:

Note that reptile-like amphibians, mammal-like reptiles, and non-avian dinosaurs are all paraphyletic.

The placement of hagfish on the vertebrate tree of life has been controversial. Their lack of proper vertebrae (among with other characteristics found in lampreys and jawed vertebrates) led phylogenetic analyses based on morphology to place them outside Vertebrata. Molecular data, however, indicates they are vertebrates closely related to lampreys. A study by Miyashita et al. (2019), 'reconciliated' the two types of analysis as it supports the Cyclostomata hypothesis using only morphological data.

Number of extant species
The number of described vertebrate species are split between tetrapods and fish. The following table lists the number of described extant species for each vertebrate class as estimated in the IUCN Red List of Threatened Species, 2014.3.

The IUCN estimates that 1,305,075 extant invertebrate species have been described, which means that less than 5% of the described animal species in the world are vertebrates.

Vertebrate species databases
The following databases maintain (more or less) up-to-date lists of vertebrate species:
 Fish: Fishbase
 Amphibians: Amphibiaweb
 Reptiles: Reptile Database
 Birds: Avibase
 Mammals: Mammal species of the World

Reproductive systems
Nearly all vertebrates undergo sexual reproduction. They produce haploid gametes by meiosis. The smaller, motile gametes are spermatozoa and the larger, non-motile gametes are ova. These fuse by the process of fertilisation to form diploid zygotes, which develop into new individuals.

Inbreeding
During sexual reproduction, mating with a close relative (inbreeding) often leads to inbreeding depression. Inbreeding depression is considered to be largely due to expression of deleterious recessive mutations. The effects of inbreeding have been studied in many vertebrate species.

In several species of fish, inbreeding was found to decrease reproductive success.

Inbreeding was observed to increase juvenile mortality in 11 small animal species.

A common breeding practice for pet dogs is mating between close relatives (e.g. between half- and full siblings). This practice generally has a negative effect on measures of reproductive success, including decreased litter size and puppy survival.

Incestuous matings in birds result in severe fitness costs due to inbreeding depression (e.g. reduction in hatchability of eggs and reduced progeny survival).

Inbreeding avoidance
As a result of the negative fitness consequences of inbreeding, vertebrate species have evolved mechanisms to avoid inbreeding.

Numerous inbreeding avoidance mechanisms operating prior to mating have been described. Toads and many other amphibians display breeding site fidelity. Individuals that return to natal ponds to breed will likely encounter siblings as potential mates. Although incest is possible, Bufo americanus siblings rarely mate. These toads likely recognize and actively avoid close kin as mates. Advertisement vocalizations by males appear to serve as cues by which females recognize their kin.

Inbreeding avoidance mechanisms can also operate subsequent to copulation. In guppies, a post-copulatory mechanism of inbreeding avoidance occurs based on competition between sperm of rival males for achieving fertilization. In competitions between sperm from an unrelated male and from a full sibling male, a significant bias in paternity towards the unrelated male was observed.

When female sand lizards mate with two or more males, sperm competition within the female's reproductive tract may occur. Active selection of sperm by females appears to occur in a manner that enhances female fitness. On the basis of this selective process, the sperm of males that are more distantly related to the female are preferentially used for fertilization, rather than the sperm of close relatives. This preference may enhance the fitness of progeny by reducing inbreeding depression.

Outcrossing
Mating with unrelated or distantly related members of the same species is generally thought to provide the advantage of masking deleterious recessive mutations in progeny (see heterosis). Vertebrates have evolved numerous diverse mechanisms for avoiding close inbreeding and promoting outcrossing (see inbreeding avoidance).

Outcrossing as a way of avoiding inbreeding depression has been especially well studied in birds. For instance, inbreeding depression occurs in the great tit (Parus major) when the offspring are produced as a result of a mating between close relatives. In natural populations of the great tit, inbreeding is avoided by dispersal of individuals from their birthplace, which reduces the chance of mating with a close relative.

Purple-crowned fairywren females paired with related males may undertake extra-pair matings that can reduce the negative effects of inbreeding, despite ecological and demographic constraints.

Southern pied babblers (Turdoides bicolor) appear to avoid inbreeding in two ways: through dispersal and by avoiding familiar group members as mates. Although both males and females disperse locally, they move outside the range where genetically related individuals are likely to be encountered. Within their group, individuals only acquire breeding positions when the opposite-sex breeder is unrelated.

Cooperative breeding in birds typically occurs when offspring, usually males, delay dispersal from their natal group in order to remain with the family to help rear younger kin. Female offspring rarely stay at home, dispersing over distances that allow them to breed independently or to join unrelated groups.

Parthenogenesis
Parthenogenesis is a natural form of reproduction in which growth and development of embryos occur without fertilization.

Reproduction in squamate reptiles is ordinarily sexual, with males having a ZZ pair of sex determining chromosomes, and females a ZW pair. However, various species, including the Colombian Rainbow boa (Epicrates maurus), Agkistrodon contortrix (copperhead snake) and Agkistrodon piscivorus (cotton mouth snake) can also reproduce by facultative parthenogenesis—that is, they are capable of switching from a sexual mode of reproduction to an asexual mode—resulting in production of WW female progeny. The WW females are likely produced by terminal automixis.

Mole salamanders are an ancient (2.4–3.8 million year-old) unisexual vertebrate lineage. In the polyploid unisexual mole salamander females, a premeiotic endomitotic event doubles the number of chromosomes. As a result, the mature eggs produced subsequent to the two meiotic divisions have the same ploidy as the somatic cells of the female salamander. Synapsis and recombination during meiotic prophase I in these unisexual females is thought to ordinarily occur between identical sister chromosomes and occasionally between homologous chromosomes. Thus little, if any, genetic variation is produced. Recombination between homeologous chromosomes occurs only rarely, if at all. Since production of genetic variation is weak, at best, it is unlikely to provide a benefit sufficient to account for the long-term maintenance of meiosis in these organisms.

Self-fertilization
Two killifish species, the mangrove killifish (Kryptolebias marmoratus) and Kryptolebias hermaphroditus, are the only known vertebrates to self-fertilize. They produce both eggs and sperm by meiosis and routinely reproduce by self-fertilisation. This capacity has apparently persisted for at least several hundred thousand years. Each individual hermaphrodite normally fertilizes itself through uniting inside the fish's body of an egg and a sperm that it has produced by an internal organ. In nature, this mode of reproduction can yield highly homozygous lines composed of individuals so genetically uniform as to be, in effect, identical to one another. Although inbreeding, especially in the extreme form of self-fertilization, is ordinarily regarded as detrimental because it leads to expression of deleterious recessive alleles, self-fertilization does provide the benefit of fertilization assurance (reproductive assurance) at each generation.

Population trends
The Living Planet Index, following 16,704 populations of 4,005 species of vertebrates, shows a decline of 60% between 1970 and 2014. Since 1970, freshwater species declined 83%, and tropical populations in South and Central America declined 89%. The authors note that, "An average trend in population change is not an average of total numbers of animals lost." According to WWF, this could lead to a sixth major extinction event. The five main causes of biodiversity loss are land-use change, overexploitation of natural resources, climate change, pollution and invasive species.

See also
 
 Exoskeleton

References

Bibliography

External links

 Tree of Life
 Tunicates and not cephalochordates are the closest living relatives of vertebrates
Vertebrate Pests chapter in United States Environmental Protection Agency and University of Florida/Institute of Food and Agricultural Sciences National Public Health Pesticide Applicator Training Manual
 The Vertebrates
 The Origin of Vertebrates Marc W. Kirschner, iBioSeminars, 2008.

Terreneuvian first appearances
Extant Cambrian first appearances